The Breton–Norman War of 1064–1066 was fought between the sovereign Duchy of Brittany and the Duchy of Normandy.

Brittany, an independent Celtic duchy, had a traditional rivalry with neighboring Normandy.

Neighboring rivals

From a historical perspective, the Bretons had steadily lost lands to the Norman's ancestors, the Seine River Vikings.

The 1064–1065 animosity between Brittany and Normandy was sparked after William the Conqueror, as Duke of Normandy, supported a Breton, Rivallon I of Dol's rebellion against the hereditary Duke of Brittany, Conan II.

In 1065, the year before his invasion of Anglo-Saxon England, William of Normandy sent word to the surrounding countries (including Brittany), warning them against attacking his lands, while he was away on the grounds that his mission bore the papal banner. However, Duke Conan promptly informed the Norman Duke that he would take the opportunity to invade the latter's Duchy.

Loss of Breton lands
Duke William's army therefore set out to appease the Breton threat.  While outside the monastery of Mont Saint-Michel, two Norman soldiers became mired in quicksand. Harold Godwinson, the Earl of Wessex and future King of England, saved them.

Battle of Dinan
The Battle of Dinan occurred in 1065.  Harold fought on the side of Duke William, whose army had chased Duke Conan from Dol-de-Bretagne to Rennes. Duke Conan finally surrendered at Château de Dinan, Brittany. The battle is recalled in the Bayeux Tapestry (see illustration).

Death of the Breton lord
During Duke Conan's 1066 campaign against Anjou, he took Pouancé and Segré, and arrived in Château-Gontier. There he was found dead on 11 December after donning poisoned riding gloves. Duke William was widely suspected.

Aftermath
Duke Conan II was succeeded by his sister, Hawise, whose marriage to Hoel of Cornwall may have been a political move to consolidate and stabilize the east and west regions of the duchy.

Bretons would eventually invade England with the Normans in 1066 mainly as cavalry, which they specialized in.

References

Bibliography

 

11th century in France
Battles involving the Normans
Conflicts in 1064
Conflicts in 1065
Conflicts in 1066
Military history of Brittany
1064 in Europe
1065 in Europe
1066 in Europe
1060s in France